A180  may refer to:
 A180 highway (Russia), a federal highway from Saint Petersburg to the Estonian border
 A180 road (England), a road connecting the M180 motorway and Cleethorpes
 A180 road (Malaysia), a road in Perak
 American-180, a submachine gun
 A-180, the first name used by the band Audio Adrenaline